Pecteneremus is a moth genus in the family Autostichidae.

Species
 Pecteneremus albella (Amsel, 1959)
 Pecteneremus decipiens Gozmány, 1967
 Pecteneremus padishah Gozmány, 1963
 Pecteneremus pharaoh Gozmány, 1963
 Pecteneremus pilatus Gozmány, 1963
 Pecteneremus walsinghami Gozmány, 1967

References

 
Symmocinae